The Espiritu Santo languages (alternatively Santo languages) are a group of North Vanuatu languages spoken on Espiritu Santo Island in northern Vanuatu. Tryon (2010) considers the Espiritu Santo languages to be a coherent group.

Languages
Two lists of Espiritu Santo languages from Tryon (2010) and François (2015) are provided below.

Tryon (2010)
Tryon (2010) recognizes 33 living languages and 2 extinct languages. They are:

François (2015)
The following list of 38 Espiritu Santo languages is from Alexandre François (2015:18-21).

Lynch (2019)
John Lynch (2019) proposes the following classification scheme for the Espiritu Santo languages, with the development of bilabial consonants to linguolabials as the primary marker of the "Nuclear Santo" group:

 Espiritu Santo
 West Santo Group
 Cape Cumberland: Hukua, Vunapu, Piamatsina (uncertain), Valpei, Nokuku, Tasmate
 Wusi
 Central Santo: Merei-Tiale, Okula
 Kiai
 Southwest Santo: Akei, Wailapa
 South-Central Santo (Lynch: "possibly three dialects")
 Outlier: Tolomako
 Nuclear Santo Group
 South Santo Group
 Tangoa
 Araki
 Mav'ea
 Tutuba
 Aore
 Tamambo
 Outlier: Mores
 East Santo Group
 Shark Bay: Shark Bay I, Shark Bay II, Lorediakarkar
 Southeast Santo: Butmas-Tur, Polonombauk, Tambotalo
 Outlier: Sakao

References 

 .

 
Languages of Vanuatu